Pirates: Duels on the High Seas is an adventure game for Nintendo DS. It was developed by Oxygen Studios and published by Oxygen Games. The game is a sequel to the similar WiiWare title, Pirates: The Key of Dreams.

Plot 
An old man in a pub presents you with a riddle; after solving this riddle, you discover that possession of seven magical keys will provide you control over the seas. After collecting the first Key from Port Royal, you find a scrap of paper which informs you that unless you obtain the other six keys in six days' time, you will perish.

Key Locations 
The keys are spread throughout the Arctic, Bermuda Triangle, China Sea, Java Sea, Persia, Port Royal and Porto Bello levels.

Reception 
The game was awarded 78% by independent gaming website zConnection, scoring a Good rating.

References 

2008 video games
Adventure games
Nintendo DS games
Nintendo DS-only games
Video games about pirates
Video games developed in the United Kingdom
Video games set in the Arctic
Video games set in Asia
Video games set in the Caribbean
Video games set in Iran
Video games set in Jamaica
Video games set in North America
Video games set in Panama
Oxygen Games games
Multiplayer and single-player video games